The Rackley Roofing 200 is a NASCAR Camping World Truck Series race held at Nashville Superspeedway in Gladeville, Tennessee. The race, which was previously held from 2001 to 2011, returned to the schedule in 2021 after ten years away.

The event replaced a race that was held on the same date at nearby Nashville Speedway USA (also known as the Nashville Fairgrounds Speedway) from 1996 to 2000. The race had been held in August during its entire first run on the Truck Series schedule, except for 2011 when it was moved to July. The track was shut down in 2012 and as a result, the race was removed from the schedule along with the track's second race in the spring, which had been held in 2010 and 2011.

The Truck Series—joining the Cup and Xfinity Series—returned to the speedway in 2021. Rackley Roofing was announced as the race's title sponsor in March of that year.

Past winners

2002, 2006 & 2009: Race extended due to a green–white–checker finish.

Multiple winner (driver)

Multiple winners (teams)

Manufacturer wins

Spring race (2010–2011)

The Bully Hill Vineyards 200 was a second Truck Series race that was held at Nashville Superspeedway on Good Friday. For the 2010 and 2011 seasons, it was the first of two Camping World Truck Series events held in Nashville, the second being the Lucas Deep Clean 200, which was held in July. It was sponsored by Bully Hill Vineyards.

2010 marked the inaugural event of the Nashville 200. In October 2009, the parent company of the Superspeedway, Dover Motorsports, Inc. announced that it would be closing Memphis Motorsports Park, which was previously scheduled to host a Truck Series race on June 26.  It was announced shortly afterward that the Memphis race would be replaced with a second race at Nashville. The race, which was scheduled for April 2, would mark the opening race of a doubleheader with the Nationwide Series, which would race the following day at the track.

With the first race, Nashville Superspeedway would become the only race track on the schedule to host two Camping World Truck Series races and not host a NASCAR Sprint Cup Series event. The race was only run twice, as the track was shut down following the 2011 season. Kyle Busch, driving a Toyota for Kyle Busch Motorsports, won the event both years it was held.

Past winners

References

External links
 

1997 establishments in Tennessee
NASCAR Truck Series races
 
Annual sporting events in the United States
Former NASCAR races